Old Boys (Chinese: 11度青春之《老男孩》) is a Chinese short comedy film directed by Xiao Yang. It became popular via the Internet. A drama adaption of the film has been announced recently.

Plot
Xiao Dabao and Wang Xiaoshuai, two boys, used to be good friends in their childhood, because they were both crazy about Michael Jackson and have both been rejected by the most beautiful girl in school. Once they had grown up, neither of them was rich or living a very comfortable life. After learning about the death of Michael Jackson, they decided to take part in a singing competition. They performed a song called "Old Boys," which contained their old memories. Unfortunately, they failed the competition once they reached the top 50. However, their performance touched the judges and a lot of the audience. Taking part in the competition ended up being an important new experience in their lives.

Cast
Xiao Yang as Xiao Dabao
Wang taili as Wang Xiaoshuai
Yu Peipei as school beauty
Han Qiuchi as Bao Xiaobai

Music

"Old Boys" (Chopsticks brothers)
"Billie Jean" (Michael Jackson)
"thriller" (Michael Jackson)
"earth song" (Michael Jackson)
"childhood" (Michael Jackson)
"sixteen-year-old" (Yang Peiguo)
"Xiao Fang" (Li Chunbo)
"pink memory" (Han Baoyi)
"sailor" (Zheng Zhihua)
"happy birthday" (Xie Na)
"Hana no Ko Lunlun" (Mitsuko Horie)

References

External links
Old boys movie in Youku (Chinese)

2010 films
Chinese comedy films
2010 comedy films
Chinese short films
2010 short films
2010s Mandarin-language films